"Precious Declaration" is the lead single from Collective Soul's third studio album, Disciplined Breakdown. A remixed version of the song was featured on MuchMusic's Diamond-certified compilation album, Big Shiny Tunes 2.

Composition

In a December 2017 interview with Songfacts, lead singer Ed Roland explained the inspiration behind "Precious Declaration":

Charts

Weekly charts

Year-end charts

References

1997 singles
1997 songs
Atlantic Records singles
Collective Soul songs
Songs written by Ed Roland